Devendra Nath Dwivedi (30 March 1935 – 1 August 2009) was an Indian politician and the Governor designate of Gujarat. He was a Congress member of the Rajya Sabha from 1974 to 1980. He died on 1 August 2009 aged 74, before he could formally take up the post of Gujarat's Governor.

References

1935 births
2009 deaths
Rajya Sabha members from Uttar Pradesh
Politicians from Varanasi
Indian National Congress politicians from Uttar Pradesh
Governors of Gujarat
20th-century Indian politicians